Alexander Craig may refer to:

 Alexander Craig (poet) (1567?–1627), Scottish poet
 Alexander Kerr Craig (1828–1892), American politician
 Alexander J. Craig (1823–1870), American educator and politician from Wisconsin
 Alex Craig (footballer) (1886–?), Irish footballer
 Alex Craig (rugby union) (born 1998), Scottish rugby union player 
 Alexander George Craig (1897–1973), author and poet

See also